The province of Ciudad Real is a province in the southwestern part of the autonomous community of Castile-La Mancha, Spain. It is bordered by the provinces of Cuenca, Albacete, Jaén, Córdoba, Badajoz, and Toledo. It is partly located in the old natural region of La Mancha. Its capital is Ciudad Real. It is the third largest province by area in all of Spain, after Cáceres and Badajoz. The historic comarca Campo de Calatrava is located in the center of the province.

History
Ciudad Real was one of the 49 provinces in which Spain was divided in the territorial reorganization of 1833, taking its name from its largest city and capital. Its limits corresponded more or less to the historical province of La Mancha, which was part of the kingdom of Toledo.

The Spanish government created the autonomous community of Castilla-La Mancha on 15 November 1978, as one of several autonomous regions. The new, hyphenated name was chosen to join the historic  Castilla region, which extended beyond the new autonomous region, and that of the smaller historic province of La Mancha. Initially a "pre-autonomous" region, the reorganization proposal finally took effect one week after the Statute of Autonomy of Castilla–La Mancha was approved on 10 August 1982. Under this new arrangement, Castilla-La Mancha was subdivided into five provinces, Albacete, Ciudad Real, Cuenca, Guadalajara and Toledo, each named after its largest town and capital city. The province of Ciudad Real was further subdivided into six comarcas (administrative districts), these being:
 Valle de Alcudia 
 Campo de Calatrava
 Mancha 
 Montes 
 Montiel 
 Sierra Morena

Geography
To the north lies the Province of Toledo, to the northeast the Province of Cuenca, to the east the Province of Albacete, to the south lie the Provinces of Córdoba and Jaén, and to the west the Province of Badajoz. To the northwest of the province is a separate area, the exclave of Anchuras, which is sandwiched between the Province of Badajoz and the Province of Toledo. The provincial capital is Ciudad Real. The main river, crossing the province from east to west, is the Guadiana, and its right bank tributary, the Cigüela.

Most of the province is an arid plain, cool in summer and very cold in winter with wide daily fluctuations. The area is agricultural, with wheat, barley, oats, sugar beet, grapes and olives being grown. Cattle are raised here and there are large flocks of sheep. In the valleys formed by the upper reaches of the Guadiana and Cigüela is a wetland area called La Mancha Húmeda. The lagoons and marshes have a resident population of wetland birds and are visited by migrating wildfowl in autumn and spring.

The largest towns in the province are Ciudad Real, with a population of 74,960 at the 2014 census, Puertollano with 50,608, Tomelloso with 38,080, Alcázar de San Juan with 31,650 and Valdepeñas with 30,705. Other larger municipalities with over ten thousand inhabitants are Manzanares, Daimiel, La Solana, Miguelturra, Campo de Criptana, Socuéllamos, Bolaños de Calatrava and Villarrubia de los Ojos.

The Tablas de Daimiel National Park is located in the province of Ciudad Real. It is a wetland area on the La Mancha plain, an otherwise mainly arid region. It has an area of about 2,000 hectares and is the smallest of Spain's fifteen national parks. It is being expanded to include some of the neighbouring dryland farming areas. The Cabañeros National Park is shared with the neighbouring Province of Toledo. It contains remnants of the Iberian Mediterranean forest which used to clothe this part of Spain.

In the centre of the province is the Campo de Calatrava, the geology of which is volcanic. The last known eruption was around 3,600 BC.

Population development
The historical population is given in the following chart:

Government and administration

Communications
The province has good communications with other parts of Spain and is on the main route between Toledo and Andalusia. The A-4 route passes from north to south between Puerto Lápice and Almuradiel on the way from Madrid to Andalusia. The capital, Puertollano, and other locations are linked to this road by the A-43 and A-41, and the Autovía de los Viñedos motorway passes through the northeastern part of the province. Railway communications are via the Madrid–Seville high-speed rail line which has stations in the towns of Ciudad Real and Puertollano. Air travel was enabled by the opening in 2008 of the Ciudad Real Central Airport, which started to have international flights in June 2010. However the link to the high speed railway line was never built and the airport had financial difficulties and went into administration in October of the same year. In September 2015 it was reported that a new owner had purchased the airport.

See also

List of municipalities in Ciudad Real

References

 
Provinces of Castilla–La Mancha